The Bréguet 17 was a two-seat biplane fighter developed in France towards the end of World War I and operated by that country during the 1920s.

Design and development
The Bréguet 17 was a derivative of the highly successful 14 bomber, but somewhat scaled down and carrying a more powerful engine and heavier machine gun armament in place of a bomb load. The French Army was impressed enough to place orders for 1,000 of these aircraft during 1918, to be delivered the following year. The end of World War I ended these plans, but some limited production did take place into the early 1920s.

Operational history
The type was operated as the Bre.17C.2 with several escadrilles as a supplement to existing aircraft, but never formed the basis for any one unit on its own. A single example was converted into a prototype night fighter, but no production ensued.

Variants
Bre.17C.2
Main production version.
Bre.17
Night fighter prototype.

Operators

French Army

Specifications

References

 
 

Single-engined tractor aircraft
Biplanes with negative stagger
1910s French fighter aircraft
 0017
Aircraft first flown in 1918